BRCA1 associated protein is a protein that in humans is encoded by the BRAP gene.

Function

The protein encoded by this gene was identified by its ability to bind to the nuclear localization signal of BRCA1 and other proteins. It is a cytoplasmic protein which may regulate nuclear targeting by retaining proteins with a nuclear localization signal in the cytoplasm. [provided by RefSeq, Jul 2008].

References

Further reading